Heggedal Station is a railway station located at Heggedal in Asker, Norway on the Spikkestad Line. Heggedal station is located around 99.2 meters above sea level and 29.34 km from Oslo Central Station.

History

The station was opened as part of the Drammen Line in 1959, but in 1973 the new Lieråsen Tunnel opened through Lieråsen, and the old part of Drammen Line was transformed to a commuter train line. The station is served by Oslo Commuter Rail trains to Oslo S and onward to Lillestrøm. Heggedal is primarily a residential area.

In 2012 the station was redeveloped to fit the new Norwegian standard for stations. And a new platform was added to the existing structure.

In late 2015 the station was remodelled and structures added. A new automobile bridge and a new pedestrian bridge was added replacing the existing level crossing.

References

Railway stations in Asker
Railway stations on the Spikkestad Line
Railway stations opened in 1874
1874 establishments in Norway